is a 2010 samurai film directed by Junji Sakamoto and starring Shingo Katori in the role of Zatoichi.

Plot
The film starts with young Ichi's wife (Satomi Ishihara) being accidentally killed by Toraji (Sosuke Takaoka), the cowardly art-loving son of a yakuza boss. Following her death, Zatoichi (Shingo Katori) returns to his hometown where he hopes to resume a normal life under the guise of farming with his friend Ryuji (Takashi Sorimachi). Unfortunately, the same group of yakuza plans to change Zatoichi's hometown into a harbor and begin exploiting local peasants for money. Ryuji's land deeds are taken and ransomed at a high price, so Zatoichi uses his gambling skills to win money for the deeds. This unveils his identity, so the yakuza burn down his house. The villagers draft a Tanran scroll to present to a passing official asking for assistance. Having Zatoichi in the village would not work in their favor, however, so the villagers devise a plan to dispose of him. They give him a blank scroll to "deliver" to the officials and lead him on a dangerous path into the yakuza. He eventually realizes it is the wrong path and makes it to the officials. The betrayal is revealed when he shows the blank scroll to the officials, who are insulted and subsequently leave. Zatoichi takes responsibility for getting rid of the yakuza onto himself, so he goes to the yakuza headquarters and kills the boss. In the end, he is shot by Toraji and stabbed by one of the yakuza minions. Crawling on hands and feet, he goes to the beach where he presumably dies and reunites with his wife in the next life.

Cast
Shingo Katori as Zatoichi
Satomi Ishihara as Tane
Takashi Sorimachi as Ryuji
Chieko Baisho as Mitsu
Seishiro Kato as Goro
Tatsuya Nakadai as Tendo
Sosuke Takaoka as Toraji
Susumu Terajima as Tatsuji
Youki Kudoh as Toyo
Arata Iura as Juzo
Kosuke Toyohara as Sen
Nakamura Kanzaburō XVIII as Masakichi
Yoshio Harada as Genkichi
Zeebra as Yasuke
Koichi Iwaki as Shimaji
Takashi Ukaji as Kajiwara
Toshio Shiba as Kitagawa

Reception
Mark Schilling of The Japan Times criticized Zatoichi: The Last, noting that the film is "ultimately chanbara (sword-fighting) entertainment, similar to The Dark Knight and other Hollywood comic book movies that try for darkness and depth but still have CG action at their center."

References

External links

Zatoichi films
2010 films
Films directed by Junji Sakamoto
Samurai films
Toho films
2010s Japanese films